A generation ship, or generation starship, is a hypothetical type of interstellar ark starship that travels at sub-light speed. Since such a ship might require hundreds to thousands of years to reach nearby stars, the original occupants of a generation ship would grow old and die, leaving their descendants to continue traveling.

Origins 
Rocket pioneer Robert H. Goddard was the first to write about long-duration interstellar journeys in his "The Ultimate Migration" (1918). In this he described the death of the Sun and the necessity of an "interstellar ark". The crew would travel for centuries in suspended animation and be awakened when they reached another star system. He proposed to use small moons or asteroids as ships, and speculated that the crew would endure psychological and genetic changes over the generations.

Konstantin Tsiolkovsky, considered a father of astronautic theory, first described the need for multiple generations of passengers in his essay, "The Future of Earth and Mankind" (1928), a space colony equipped with engines that travels thousands of years which he called "Noah's Ark". In the story, the crew had changed so much over the generations at so many levels that they did not even acknowledge Earth as their home planet. 

Another early description of a generation ship is in the 1929 essay "The World, The Flesh, & The Devil" by John Desmond Bernal. Bernal's essay was the first publication to reach the public and influence other writers. He wrote about the concept of human evolution and mankind's future in space through methods of living that we now describe as a generation starship, and which could be seen in the generic word "globes".

Definition 
According to Hein et al., a "generation ship" is a spacecraft on which a crew is living on-board for at least several decades, such that it comprises multiple generations. Several sub-categories of generation ships are distinguished: sprinter, slow boat, colony ship, world ship.
The Enzmann starship is categorised as "slow boat" because of the Astronomy Magazine title "Slow Boat to Centauri" (1977). Gregory Matloff's concept is called a "colony ship" and Alan Bond called his concept a "world ship". These definitions are essentially based on the velocity of the ship and population size.

Obstacles

Biosphere
Such a ship would have to be entirely self-sustaining, providing life support for everyone aboard. It must have extraordinarily reliable systems that could be maintained by the ship's inhabitants over long periods of time. This would require testing whether thousands of humans could survive on their own before sending them beyond the reach of help. Small artificial closed ecosystems, such as Biosphere 2, have been built in an attempt to examine the engineering challenges of such a system, with mixed results.

Biology and society
Generation ships would have to anticipate possible biological, social and morale problems, and would also need to deal with matters of self-worth and purpose for the various crews involved.

Estimates of the minimum reasonable population for a generation ship vary. Anthropologist John Moore has estimated that, without genetic testing of people before boarding the ship, social control and / or social engineering (such as requiring people to wait until their thirties to have children), nor cryopreservation of eggs, sperm, or embryos (as is done in sperm banks), a minimum of 160 people boarding the ship would allow normal family life (with the average individual having ten potential marriage partners) throughout a 200-year space journey, with little loss of genetic diversity. If the people who board the ship are couples, presumably in their early twenties, and everybody who lives in the ship is required to wait until their mid to late thirties before having children, then the minimum would be just 80 people. However, many variables are not accounted for in the estimate, including the higher chance of health problems for both the woman who is pregnant and the fetus or baby because of the pregnant woman's age. In 2013, anthropologist Cameron Smith reviewed existing literature and created a new computer model to estimate a minimum reasonable population in the tens of thousands. Smith's numbers were much larger than previous estimates such as Moore's, in part because Smith takes the risk of accidents and disease into consideration, and assumes at least one severe population catastrophe over the course of a 150-year journey.

In light of the multiple generations that it could take to reach even our nearest neighboring star systems such as Proxima Centauri, further issues on the viability of such interstellar arks include:

 the possibility of humans dramatically evolving in directions unacceptable to the sponsors
 the minimum population required to maintain in isolation a culture acceptable to the sponsors; this could include such aspects as
 ability to learn scientific and technical skills needed to maintain, operate and pilot the ship
 ability to accomplish the purpose (planetary colonization, research, building new interstellar arks) contemplated
 sharing the values of the sponsors, which may not be likely to be empirically demonstrated to be viable beyond the home planet unless, once the ship is away from Earth and on its way, survival of one's offspring until the ship reaches the target star is one motivation.

Size
For a spacecraft to maintain a stable environment for multiple generations, it would have to be large enough to support a community of humans and a fully recycling ecosystem. A spacecraft of such a size would require much energy to accelerate and decelerate. A smaller spacecraft, while able to accelerate more easily and thus make higher cruise velocities more practical, would reduce exposure to cosmic radiation and the time for malfunctions to develop in the craft, but would have challenges with resource metabolic flow and ecologic balance.

Social breakdown
Generation ships traveling for long periods of time may see breakdowns in social structures. Changes in society (for example, mutiny) could occur over such periods and may prevent the ship from reaching its destination. This state was described by Algis Budrys in a 1966 book review:

Robert A. Heinlein's Orphans of the Sky (the "impeccable statement of this theme", Budrys said) and Brian Aldiss's Non-Stop (U.S. title: Starship) discussed such societies.

Cosmic rays

The radiation environment of deep space is very different from that on the Earth's surface, or in low earth orbit, due to the much larger influx of high-energy galactic cosmic rays (GCRs). Like other ionizing radiation, high-energy cosmic rays can damage DNA and increase the risk of cancer, cataracts, and neurological disorders. One known practical solution to this problem is surrounding the crewed parts of the ship with a thick enough shielding such as a thick layer of maintained ice as proposed in The Songs of Distant Earth, a science fiction novel by Arthur C. Clarke (note: in this book the ship's mammoth ice shield is only in the forward part of the ship, preventing micrometeors from damaging the ship during its interstellar journey).

Ethical considerations
The success of a generation ship depends on children born aboard taking over the necessary duties, as well as having children themselves. Even if their quality of life might be better than, for example, that of people born into poverty on Earth, philosophy professor Neil Levy has raised the question of whether it is ethical to severely constrain life choices of individuals by locking them into a project they did not choose. A moral quandary exists regarding how intermediate generations, those destined to be born and die in transit without actually seeing tangible results of their efforts, might feel about their forced existence on such a ship.

Project Hyperion
Project Hyperion, launched in December 2011 by Icarus Interstellar, was to perform a preliminary study that defines integrated concepts for a crewed interstellar generation ship. This was a two-year study mainly based out of the WARR student group at the Technical University of Munich. The study aimed to provide an assessment of the feasibility of crewed interstellar flight using current and near-future technologies. It also aimed to guide future research and technology development plans as well as to inform the public about crewed interstellar travel. Notable results of the project include an assessment of world ship system architectures and adequate population size. The core team members have transferred to the Initiative for Interstellar Studies's world ship project and a survey paper on generation ships has been presented at the ESA Interstellar Workshop in 2019 as well as in ESA's Acta Futura journal.

See also
Autarky
Embryo space colonization
O'Neill cylinder
Self-replicating spacecraft
Sleeper ship

References

Further reading
 Caroti, Simone (2011). “The Generation Starship in Science Fiction: A Critical History, 1934-2001” Mcfarland. .

External links 
 
 
  Brief summary of the evolution of generation ship concepts.
 

Space colonization
Hypothetical spacecraft
Fictional spacecraft by type
Interstellar travel
 
Science fiction themes
Space farming
Self-sustainability